Egleston may refer to:

People
William Egleston, Member of Parliament 1553, 1554, and 1586, for Winchelsea
Nathaniel Egleston (1822–1912), American clergyman and forester
Olivia Egleston (1784–1859), wife of businessman Anson Greene Phelps, co-founder of the Phelps Dodge Company
Thomas Egleston (1832–1900), American engineer who helped found Columbia University's School of Mines
Hawley Egleston, of Michigan, finished 3rd place at the 120-yard high hurdles of the 1933 NCAA Track and Field Championships
Rita Egleston, nominated for an Outstanding Sound Editing 27th Daytime Emmy Awards for The Phantom Eye
John Egleston Paterson (1800–?), an American farmer, lawyer and politician from New York

Places
United States
Egleston Square, at the intersection of Washington Street and Columbus Avenue in the Roxbury neighborhood of Boston, Massachusetts.

Other uses
List of minor planets: 8001–9000#601
Egleston (MBTA station), a former rapid transit station in the Greater Boston area.
Egleston Substation an electrical substation in Boston, Massachusetts.
Henrietta Egleston Hospital for Children in Atlanta, Georgia.